Earl Adrel Pritchard (born October 6, 1884, date of death unknown) was an American football, basketball, and baseball coach.  He served as the head football coach at Oklahoma Agricultural and Mechanical College, now Oklahoma State University–Stillwater, for two seasons, from 1917 to 1918, compiling record of 8–7.  Oklahoma A&M was then a member of the Southwest Conference. On Thanksgiving weekend of 1917, Pritchard led the Aggies to a 9–0 victory over their in-state rivals, the Oklahoma Sooners.  Pritchard was also the head basketball coach at Oklahoma A&M from 1917 to 1919, tallying a mark of 11–15, and the head baseball coach at the school from 1917 to 1918, notching a record of 3–13.

Head coaching record

Football

References

1884 births
Year of death missing
Basketball coaches from Kansas
Oklahoma State Cowboys baseball coaches
Oklahoma State Cowboys basketball coaches
Oklahoma State Cowboys football coaches
Sportspeople from Kansas City, Kansas